Minister of Social Action, Family and Gender Promotion of Angola is a cabinet level position in the national government of Angola. The position was established in 2002 with Cândida Celeste da Silva.

Ministers of Social Action, Family and Gender Promotion
 2002–2010: Cândida Celeste da Silva
 2010–2012: Genoveva da Conceição Lino
 2012–2017: Maria Filomena de Fátima Lobão Telo Delgado
 2017–2019: Victória Francisco Correia da Conceição
 2019–present: Faustina Fernandes Inglês de Almeida Alves

References

External links
 Official Website

Social Action, Family and Gender Promotion
Family Ministers
Politics of Angola